The Ernest Cook Trust is a large educational charity in England. It was founded in 1952 by the philanthropist Ernest Cook, the grandson of Thomas Cook.  Each year the Trustees distribute more than £1.25m in educational grants to benefit children and young people, notably to schools for improving their outdoor education and play areas.

About
Rooted in the conservation and management of the countryside, the Trust also actively encourages children and young people to learn from the land through hands-on educational opportunities on its estates and by offering grants.

Estates
The Trust currently owns and manages  of landed estates across five counties in southern England.

The trust owns  of land and is responsible for the following estates:
 The Fairford Park Estate
 The Barnsley Village Estate
 The Little Dalby Estate
 The Hartwell Estate
 The Boarstall Estate
 The Slimbridge Estate
 The Trent Estate
 The Filkins Estate
 The Hatherop Estate

The Trust was also instrumental in the development of the Fairford Leys housing estate on land it owned in Aylesbury, Buckinghamshire.

References

Further reading
 Collins, E. J. T. and Giles, A. K. (1989). Innovation and Conservation: Ernest Edward Cook and his Country Estates. University of Reading. .

External links 
Ernest Cook Trust website

Educational charities based in the United Kingdom
Charities based in Gloucestershire